Baumann is a German surname, and may refer to:

A 
 Albert Baumann, Swiss Olympic shooter
 Alex Baumann (born 1964), Canadian swimmer
 Alex Baumann (bobsleigh) (born 1985), Swiss bobsledder
 Alexander Baumann (disambiguation), multiple people
 Alyssa Baumann (born 1998), American artistic gymnast
 Arthur Anthony Baumann (1856–1936), British lawyer and Conservative politician
 August Christian Baumann (1770–1831), Norwegian mine superintendent and politician

B 
 Bernd Baumann (born 1958), German politician
 Bill Baumann (born 1942), Australian politician
 Buddy Baumann (disambiguation), multiple people

C 
 Cajetan J. B. Baumann (1899–1969), American architect
 Carsten Baumann (footballer, born 1946), German football player
 Carsten Baumann (footballer, born 1974), German football player
 Charles O. Baumann (1874 – 1931) American film producer
 Charlie Baumann (born 1967), American footballer
 Craig Baumann (born 1953), Australian politician

D 
 Dieter Baumann (born 1965), German athlete

E 
 Edgar Baumann (born 1970), Paraguayan javelin thrower
 Elisabeth Jerichau-Baumann (1819–1881), Danish painter
 Emil Baumann, co-creator of Toblerone
 Eric Baumann (cyclist) (born 1980), German cyclist
 Ernst Baumann (1909–1992), Swiss painter
 Erwin Friedrich Baumann (1890–1980), Swiss architect
 Eugen Baumann, (1846–1896), German chemist

F 
 Frank Baumann (disambiguation), multiple people
 Franz Baumann (born 1953), United Nations official
 Fritz Baumann (1886–1942), Swiss painter

G 
 Georg Baumann, Estonian wrestler
 Günter Baumann (born 1947), German politician
 Gustave Baumann (1881–1971), American printmaker and painter

H 
 Hans Baumann (disambiguation), multiple people
 Heinz Baumann (disambiguation), multiple people
 Herbert Baumann (1925–2020), German composer
 Hermann Baumann (disambiguation), multiple people
 Hilary Baumann Hacker (1913–1990), Roman Catholic Bishop
 Horst H. Baumann (1934–2019), German architect, designer, light artist and photographer

I 
 Isabel Baumann (born 1978), Swiss bobsledder

J 
 James Baumann, American politician
 Johannes Baumann (1874–1953), Swiss politician

K 
 Karsten Baumann (born 1969), German footballer
 Ken Baumann (born 1989), American actor

L 
 Lorena Baumann (born 1997), Swiss footballer
 Ludwig Baumann (architect), (1873–1936), Austrian architect
 Ludwig Baumann (born 1950), German opera singer

M 
 Matthias Baumann (born 1963), German equestrian
 Max Baumann (1917–1999), German composer
 Michael Baumann (1947–2016), German author and terrorist
 Mike Baumann (born 1995), American baseball player

O 
 Oliver Baumann (born 1990), German footballer
 Oscar Baumann (1864–1899), Austrian explorer in Africa

P 
 Paddy Baumann (1885–1969), American baseball player
 Patrik Baumann (born 1986), Swiss footballer
 Pauline Baumann (1899–1977), British artist
 Paweł Baumann (born 1983), Polish sprint canoer
 Peter Baumann (disambiguation), multiple people

R 
 Rainer Baumann (born 1930), German footballer
 Randy Baumann (born 1972), American radio personality
 Romed Baumann (born 1986), Austrian alpine skier

W 
 Werner Baumann (born 1962), German chief executive (CEO) of Bayer.
 Wilhelm Baumann (1912–1990), German handball player

See also 
 Baumann family (architects)
 Bauman
 Bowman (disambiguation)
 Paumann

German-language surnames
Occupational surnames